Ulik-Yelga (Ülekyılğa) is a rural locality (a village) in Dyurtyulinsky Selsoviet, Sharansky District, Bashkortostan, Russia. The population was 36 as of 2010. There is 1 street.

Geography 
Ulik-Yelga is located 16 km southwest of Sharan (the district's administrative centre) by road. Chalmaly is the nearest rural locality.

References 

Rural localities in Sharansky District